Danillo Ribeiro Cardoso (born 14 January 1993), known as Danillo Ribeiro or simply Danillo, is a Brazilian footballer who plays for Patrocinense as either a left back or an attacking midfielder.

Club career
Born in Iporá, Goiás, Danillo made his senior debut with Iporá in 2012, in Campeonato Goiano Segunda Divisão. He subsequently represented Umuarama Esporte Clube, Fernandópolis, Esporte Clube Quirinópolis (two stints), Luziânia under the period of two years, appearing in Série D with the latter.

In December 2014 Danillo joined Taubaté, in Campeonato Paulista Série A3. On 20 August of the following year he moved to Olímpia.

On 19 December 2015 Danillo signed a one-year deal with Santos, being assigned to the under-23 squad. He struggled severely with injuries during his spell, and moved back to his first club Iporá in November 2017.

On 3 July 2018, Danillo moved to Série B side Atlético Goianiense, but failed to appear for the club. Ahead of the 2019 season he joined Villa Nova, but moved back to Iporá on 1 February of that year.

Career statistics

Honours
Taubaté
Campeonato Paulista Série A3: 2015

References

External links

Khodor Soccer profile 

1993 births
Living people
Sportspeople from Goiás
Brazilian footballers
Association football midfielders
Campeonato Brasileiro Série D players
Esporte Clube Taubaté players
Santos FC players
Atlético Clube Goianiense players
Villa Nova Atlético Clube players
Goiânia Esporte Clube players
Iporá Esporte Clube players
Comercial Futebol Clube (Ribeirão Preto) players
Morrinhos Futebol Clube players
Clube Atlético Patrocinense players